The Insurance functional constituency is a functional constituency in the elections for the Legislative Council of Hong Kong first created in 1998. Being of the functional constituencies with fewest electorates, the constituency is restricted to only 126 insurers as of 2021. It corresponds to the Insurance Subsector in the Election Committee.

A similar Financing, Insurance, Real Estate and Business Services functional constituency was created for the 1995 election by Governor Chris Patten with a much larger electorate base of total 171,534 eligible voters.

Return members

Electoral results
Instant-runoff voting system is used from 1998 to 2021. Since 2021, first-past-the-post voting system is in use.

2020s

2010s

2000s

1990s

References

Constituencies of Hong Kong
Constituencies of Hong Kong Legislative Council
Functional constituencies (Hong Kong)
1998 establishments in Hong Kong
Constituencies established in 1998